Worship  is an act of religious devotion usually directed towards a deity. 

Worship may also refer to:

 Worship (style), an honorific prefix

Entertainment
 "Worship", an episode of The Powerpuff Girls

Music
 Worship, a Roman Catholic hymnal; see List of hymnals
 Contemporary worship music
 Worship (Michael W. Smith album), 2001
 Worship (A Place to Bury Strangers album), 2012
 Worship (Hypocrisy album), 2021
 "Worship", a song by English band Years & Years from their 2015 album Communion
 "Worship", a song by American singer Lizzo from her 2016 EP Coconut Oil
 "Worship", a song by Australian band Golden Features from their 2018 album Sect

See also
 Praise and worship (disambiguation)
 Worship Music (disambiguation)